Askerswell is a small village and civil parish in the county of Dorset in southwest England. It is sited on the small River Asker. In the 2011 census the civil parish had a population of 154.

Toponymy
The name Askerswell is derived from Osgar's Well or its Viking equivalent Asger's Well, though local tradition is that Askers' Well is Dorset dialect for newts' well and refers to the name of the stream flowing through the village ("Askers" or the River Asker).

History
In 1086 in the Domesday Book Askerswell was recorded as Oscherwille; it had 30 households, was in Eggardon Hundred and the lord and tenant-in-chief was Tavistock Abbey.

Askerswell parish church has an early 15th-century west tower, but the rest of the building was rebuilt by Talbot Bury in 1858.

There are twenty structures in the parish that are listed by English Heritage for their historic or architectural interest. There are no structures listed as Grade I (the highest rating), but the parish church and South Eggardon Farmhouse are Grade II*.

Governance

In the United Kingdom national parliament Askerswell is in the West Dorset parliamentary constituency, which is currently represented by Oliver Letwin of the Conservative Party. In local government, Askerswell is governed by Dorset Council at the highest tier. At the parish level—the lowest tier—Askerswell does not have a parish council; instead it has a parish meeting.

In national parliament and district council elections, Dorset is divided into several electoral wards, with Askerswell being within Netherbury electoral ward. In county council elections, Askerswell is in the Bride Valley electoral division, one of 42 divisions that elect councillors to Dorset County Council.

Geography
Askerswell civil parish extends from the A35 trunk road on Askerswell Down in the south to the Iron Age hillfort on Eggardon Hill in the northeast and Knowle Hill in the northwest. The surrounding parishes are Loders to the west, Shipton Gorge to the southwest, Chilcombe to the south, Litton Cheney to the southeast and east, West Compton to the northeast and Powerstock to the north. All of Askerswell parish is within the Dorset Area of Outstanding Natural Beauty.

The main road running through the village is Hembury Road.

Demography
In the 2011 census Askerswell civil parish had 86 dwellings, 71 households and a population of 154. The average age of residents was 51.7, compared to 39.3 for England as a whole. 27.9% of residents were age 65 or over, compared to 16.4% for England as a whole.

Amenities
Askerswell village has a village hall, located by the road to Spyway. There is also a village pub, first licensed in 1845 - The Spyway Inn.

References

External links
 

Villages in Dorset